Pauric Campion is an Irish hurler who plays club hurling for Drom & Inch and at inter-county level with the Tipperary senior hurling team.

Career
On 12 February 2023, he made his league debut for Tipperary in the second round of the 2023 National Hurling League against Kilkenny, as Tipperary won by 2–24 to 1–21.

References

Living people
Tipperary inter-county hurlers
Drom-Inch hurlers
Year of birth missing (living people)